The Europe/Africa Zone is one of the three zones of the regional Davis Cup competition in 1988.

In the Europe/Africa Zone there are two different tiers, called groups, in which teams compete against each other to advance to the upper tier. Winners in the Europe Zone Group II advance to the Europe/Africa Zone Group I in 1989.

Participating nations

Draw

  are promoted to Group I in 1989.

First round

Norway vs. Malta

Second round

Poland vs. Luxembourg

Greece vs. Turkey

Norway vs. Monaco

Ireland vs. Cyprus

Third round

Greece vs. Poland

Ireland vs. Norway

Fourth round

Ireland vs. Greece

References

External links
Davis Cup official website

Davis Cup Europe/Africa Zone
Europe Zone Group II